Satyam Choudhary (born 25 November 1990) is an Indian cricketer who plays for Madhya Pradesh.

References

External links
 

1990 births
Living people
Indian cricketers
Madhya Pradesh cricketers
People from Mhow